= Kewaine Smith =

Jamaica born civil engineer and entrepreneur

Kewaine Smith is a Jamaican-born civil engineer, entrepreneur, investor, writer, and member of the United States Air Force. He is the founder and CEO of Smithous LLC, a consulting and advisory company. He is also CFO of Two Square Construction Inc.

== Education ==
Smith attended the University of the West Indies, Mona campus, where he earned a degree in civil engineering. His academic background in engineering informed his interests in infrastructure, construction, analytical problem-solving, and business development.

== Career ==
Smith holds a degree in civil engineering from the University of the West Indies, Mona. His professional include infrastructure development, construction, engineering project management, and structural systems. His engineering background has also informed his approach to entrepreneurship and investment, particularly in areas involving long-term planning, operational structure, and asset development.

Smith serves in the United States Air Force in the field of aerospace medicine. His military work involves supporting medical operations and working in environments requiring technical proficiency, operational discipline, and accountability. His military service constitutes a separate professional track alongside his interests in engineering and entrepreneurship.

Smith is the founder of Smithous LLC, a consulting and advisory firm focused on strategy, operations, and project execution. The company reflects his business development, structured management, and long-term organizational growth. Smith has also expressed interests in real estate, investment, and asset ownership.

== Publication ==
His published articles include:

•“Discipline Is the Real Advantage No One Wants to Talk About”

•“The Silent Advantage – Why Self-Awareness Is the Most Underrated Form of Power”

•“Why Most People Don’t Lack Opportunity but Lack Leverage”
